This is a list of games by Strategic Simulations Inc (SSI), the former video game developer and publisher that existed from 1979 to approximately 2001. In March 2001, SSI was acquired by Ubisoft, who retired the brand name sometime afterwards.

References

External links
 List of Strategic Simulations, Inc. games from MobyGames

Strategic Simulations, Inc.